DCMI may refer to:

Double crossover merging interchange, a proposed type of road interchange
Dublin Core Metadata Initiative, the organization responsible for maintaining the Dublin Core metadata standard
Data Center Manageability Interface, a technical specification first published by Intel in 2008